This list of Syracuse University buildings catalogs currently-existing structures of Syracuse University in Syracuse, New York. 

The University's archives document the university's buildings back to the start of its operations in rented space in 1871.

Two of the oldest surviving buildings, the Hall of Languages (1873) and Crouse College (1888-89), were listed on the National Register of Historic Places in the 1970s.  Fifteen of the buildings on the original campus of the university, including those two, termed the Comstock Tract Buildings, were listed on the National Register as a historic district in 1980.

Locations of those having coordinates below may be seen together in a map by clicking on "Map all coordinates using OpenStreetMap" at the right side of this page.

Buildings are listed alphabetically.

KEY

See also
SUNY College of Environmental Science and Forestry
SUNY Upstate Medical University
Syracuse University-Comstock Tract Buildings
University Hill, Syracuse

References

External links
University Archives: Buildings of SU 

 Syracuse University Buildings Archive list

Syracuse University buildings
Buildings
Syracuse University
Syracuse University